Fred Bunjo (born 14 March 1965) is a Ugandan weightlifter. He competed in the men's middleweight event at the 1984 Summer Olympics.

References

External links
 

1965 births
Living people
Ugandan male weightlifters
Olympic weightlifters of Uganda
Weightlifters at the 1984 Summer Olympics
Place of birth missing (living people)